Paka may refer to:

Places

Europe
 Paka (river), a river in northern Slovenia
 Paka, Mislinja, a settlement in the Municipality of Mislinja, Slovenia
 Paka pri Predgradu, a settlement in the Municipality of Kočevje, Slovenia
 Paka pri Velenju, a settlement in the Municipality of Velenje, Slovenia
 Paka, Dobrepolje, a settlement in the Municipality of Dobrepolje, Slovenia
 Paka, Vitanje, a settlement in the Municipality of Vitanje, Slovenia
 Páka in Zala County, Hungary
 Paka, Požega-Slavonia County, a village in Croatia
 Paka, Varaždin County, a village in Croatia
 Päka, a village in Põlva County in southeastern Estonia

Elsewhere
 Paka, Malaysia, a town in Malaysia
 Paka (state constituency)
 Paca (mountain), Peru
 Paka (volcano), a volcano in Kenya
 Typhoon Paka, a 1997's cyclone in the Pacific Ocean

See also
 Paka'a, god of the wind and the inventor of the sail in Hawaiian mythology
 Paca (disambiguation)